Estahlak (also Romanized as Estahlak; also known as Astalak and Eştalak) is a village in Khorram Dasht Rural District, Kamareh District, Khomeyn County, Markazi Province, Iran. At the 2006 census, its population was 41, in 9 families.

References 

Populated places in Khomeyn County